Mayela María de Lourdes Quiroga Tamez (born 2 July 1976) is a Mexican politician affiliated with the Institutional Revolutionary Party. As of 2014 she served as Deputy of the LIX Legislature of the Mexican Congress representing Nuevo León.

References

1976 births
Living people
Politicians from Monterrey
Women members of the Chamber of Deputies (Mexico)
Institutional Revolutionary Party politicians
21st-century Mexican politicians
21st-century Mexican women politicians
Autonomous University of Nuevo León alumni
Academic staff of the Autonomous University of Nuevo León
Deputies of the LIX Legislature of Mexico
Members of the Chamber of Deputies (Mexico) for Nuevo León